The Aby Lagoon complex is the second largest lagoon in Ivory Coast, after Ébrié Lagoon. It drains into the Atlantic Ocean through shallow channels between the Ehotilé Islands that converge at Assinie-Mafia, where Assoindé Lagoon also connects from the west. Assoindé Lagoon connects the Aby Lagoon complex to Ébrié Lagoon through the Assinie Canal.

The Aby Lagoon complex comprises three named sections: from west to east, they are the Aby Lagoon proper, Tendo Lagoon, and Ehy Lagoon. Located in Ivory Coast, Ehy Lagoon extends northeast from the eastern end of Tendo Lagoon, covering . A subsidiary lagoon known as Univaye Lagoon is located in Ghana and drains into Tendo Lagoon from the east.

The Bia River feeds the main Aby Lagoon from the north, while the Tano River discharges into Tendo Lagoon from the east.

The climate in the area features two rainy seasons (May to July; October to November) and two dry seasons (August to September; December to April). Salinity in the lagoon varies with rainfall and peaks in March and April. The southern part of the main Aby Lagoon has the highest salinity, while the areas near the mouths of the Bia and Tano remain fresh throughout the year.

Agriculture and fishing are the main economic activities around the lagoon. Ethmalosa fimbriata accounts for 60% to 80% of the fish catch in the lagoon. The main crops in the surrounding area are coconut, oil palm, banana, cocoa and coffee.

The Ehotilé Islands are protected as Îles Ehotilés National Park, established in 1974 on the initiative of the local communities.

References

Lagoons of Ivory Coast
Lagoons of Ghana
Ramsar sites in Ivory Coast